Tania is a genus of lichenized fungi in the family Roccellaceae. It has two species. The genus was circumscribed by Maria Egea Fernández, Pilar Torrente and Harrie Sipman in 1995, with Tania lanosa assigned as the type, and at that time, only species. A second species, T. mohamedii, was added to the genus in 2006. The genus name honours bryologist Benito Ching Tan (1946–2016), who organized the expedition to Mount Kinabalu and collected the type species with Sipman.

Species
 Tania lanosa 
 Tania mohamedii

References

Roccellaceae
Arthoniomycetes genera
Lichen genera
Taxa named by Harrie Sipman
Taxa described in 1995